Hemisalanx brachyrostralis is a species of icefish endemic to the Yangtze basin, China. It is the only known species in the genus Hemisalanx, after Hemisalanx prognathus was moved to genus Salanx. In a study of the five freshwater icefish species in the Yangtze, it was a relatively low-density species, being much less frequent than Neosalanx taihuensis and N. oligodontis, but more than Protosalanx hyalocranius and N. tangkahkeii.

References 

Salangidae
Monotypic ray-finned fish genera
Freshwater fish of China
Endemic fauna of China
Fish described in 1934
Taxa named by Charles Tate Regan